Trichaeta schultzei is a moth in the subfamily Arctiinae. It was described by Per Olof Christopher Aurivillius in 1905 and is found in Cameroon and Nigeria.

References

Arctiidae genus list at Butterflies and Moths of the World of the Natural History Museum

Moths described in 1905
Arctiinae